Lilias is a feminine given name. Notable people with the name include:

 Lilias Armstrong (1882 – 1937), British phonetician 
 Lilias Craven, fictional character in the children's novel The Secret Garden (1911)
 Lilias Farley (1907–1989), Canadian artist
 Lilias Folan (20th century), television show host
 Lilias Mary Gower (1877 – 1959), Welsh croquet player
Lillias Maitland (1862–1932), one of the first women graduates from a Scottish university, University of Edinburgh 1893
 Lilias Massey, Chatelaine of Rideau Hall
 Lilias Torrance Newton (1896 – 1980), Canadian painter
 Lilias Trotter (1853 – 1928), Christian missionary in Algeria
 Lillias Hamilton (1858 – 1925), British doctor
 Lilias Rider Haggard (1892 – 1968), English writer
 Lillias Rumsey Sanford (1850 – 1940), founder of Rumsey Hall School
 Lillias Margaret Skene (1867 – 1957), Australian feminist
 Lillias White, American actress

Scottish feminine given names